Brookhaven Instruments Corporation is a Nova Instruments company established in the late 1960s. Their products use methods including static, dynamic, electrophoretic, phase analysis light scattering, and centrifuge technologies, and sells machinery with uses in protein, polymer and particle characterization, using techniques such as zeta potential, molecular weight, chromatography and dynamic light scattering.

NASA 
Microgravity experiments performed aboard the US Space Shuttle Columbia helped physicists and chemical engineers at Princeton University and NASA understand how the properties of engineering materials are determined by their atomic structure. Equipment supplied by Brookhaven Instruments has been used to solve fundamental problems in condensed matter physics and led to new materials for manufacturing-related industries.

They flew their apparatus, called PHaSE (Physics of Hard Spheres Experiment), into space in April 1997. It was one of a number of projects participating in NASA's Microgravity Science Laboratory-1 mission, aboard the Columbia. The long-duration microgravity environment, provided by the shuttle, made it an ideal platform for the study. The tests of the PHaSE operation used two Brookhaven BI-9000AT Digital Correlators which interpreted the data from the light scattering apparatus, sampling the signal at intervals of 25 billionths of a second.

Products 
Brookhaven has an extensive range of products for particle characterization.
 90Plus  Particle Size Analyzer. Based on the principles of Dynamic Light Scattering (DLS) the 90Plus analyzes samples from less than 1 nm to 6 µm.
 ZetaPALS  Zeta potential Analyzer. The ZetaPALS utilizes phase analysis light scattering to determine the electrophoretic mobility of charged, colloidal suspensions. Phase analysis light scattering produces more highly accurate sample measurements versus traditional light scattering methods.
 ZetaPlus  Zeta Potential Analyzer. The ZetaPlus measures complete electrophoretic mobility distributions in seconds including multimodal and bimodal.
 BI-MwA  Molecular Weight Analyzer. The BI-MwA is a multiangle light scattering detector suitable for Size-exclusion chromatography(SEC), Gel permeation chromatography (GPC) or stand-alone use. It determines the absolute molecular weight of proteins and polymers.
 BI-200SM  Research Goniometer and Full Laser Light Scattering System. The BI-200SM is a stepping motor controlled instrument for multiangle light scattering measurements. This system can measure in both Dynamic Light Scattering (DLS) and Static Light Scattering (SLS).
 BI-XDC  X-Ray Disk Centrifuge, provides both centrifugal and gravitational sedimentation with an X-ray technology to give error-free, fast and accurate high-resolution size distributions across the "one-micron" transition region. Particle size distribution range from 10 nanometers right up to 100 microns.
 NanoBrook Omni  Particle Size Analyzer and Zeta Potential Analyzer. Combines functions of different machines into one.

References 

1. Maisie J. Joralemon, Rachel K. O'Reilly, Craig J. Hawker, and Karen L. Wooley, "Shell Click-Crosslinked (SCC) Nanoparticles: A New Methodology for Synthesis and Orthogonal Functionalization," J. AM. CHEM. SOC. 2005, 127, 16892-16899.

2. Giuseppe Battaglia and Anthony J. Ryan, "Bilayers and Interdigitation in Block Copolymer Vesicles," J. AM. CHEM. SOC. 2005, 127, 8757-8764.

3. Fuke Wang, Ming-Yong Han, Khine Yi Mya, Yubo Wang, and Yee-Hing Lai, "Aggregation-Driven Growth of Size-Tunable Organic Nanoparticles Using Electronically Altered Conjugated Polymers," J. AM. CHEM. SOC. 2005, 127, 10350-10355.

4. Guojun Liu, Xiaohu Yan, Zhao Li, Jiayun Zhou, and Scott Duncan, "End Coupling of Block Copolymer Nanotubes to Nanospheres," J. AM. CHEM. SOC. 2003, 125, 14039-14045.

5. Juan A. Gonzalez-Leon, Metin H. Acar, Sang-Woog Ryu, Anne-Valerie G. Ruzette, and Anne M. Mayes, "Low-Temperature Processing of 'Baroplastics' by Pressure-Induced Flow", NATURE 2003, 426, 424-428.

6. Wei-Chun Chin, Monica V. Orellana and Pedro Verdugo, "Spontaneous Assembly of Marine Dissolved Organic Matter into Polymer Gels," NATURE 1998, 391, 568-572.

7. Ziv Reich, J. Jay Boniface, Daniel S. Lyons, Nina Borochov, Ellen J. Wachtel, and Mark M. Davis, "Ligand-Specific Oligomerization of T-cell receptor Molecules" NATURE 1997, 387, 617-620.

8. J. S. Martinez, G. P. Zhang, P. D. Holt, H.-T. Jung, C. J. Carrano, M. G. Haygood, Alison Butler, "Self-Assembling Amphiphilic Siderophores from Marine Bacteria," SCIENCE 2000, 287, 1245-1247.

9. Zhibin Guan, P. M. Cotts, E. F. McCord, S. J. McLain, "Chain Walking: A New Strategy to Control Polymer Topology," SCIENCE 1999, 283, 2059-2062.

10. Improved Techniques for Particle Size Determination by Quasi-Elastic Light Scattering by I. D. Morrison, E. G. Grabowski, and C. A. Herb, Langmuir 1 (1985), 496-501.

11. Characterization of Food Colloids by Phase Analysis Light Scattering, S. Vanapalli and J.N. Coupland, Food Hydrocolloids, 14(2000), 315-317.

12. 

13. https://web.archive.org/web/20120327201334/http://www.brookhaveninstruments.com/literature/pdf/TurboCorr/SpaceShuttleBI.pdf

External links 
 Brookhaven Instruments Corporation
 Nova Instruments

Companies established in the 1960s
Companies based in New York (state)
1960s establishments in New York (state)